The Charles de Gaulle Bridge is a bridge that links the eastern tip of the island of Montreal, Quebec over the Rivière des Prairies to the Lanaudière region near the city of Charlemagne. The bridge is named after French President Charles de Gaulle, who inspired the Quebec sovereignty movement in the 1960s with his Vive le Québec libre speech in Montreal in 1967, the same year the bridge was built.

The bridge is part of Quebec Autoroute 40 and is only one of two bridge crossings from Montreal to the Repentigny-Charlemagne region, the other being Pierre Le Gardeur Bridge, on Notre-Dame Street. As being by far the fastest link to Downtown Montreal, the road is often very congested during rush hours, with traffic backing up as far as Repentigny in the morning with heavy congestion eastbound during the afternoon. The bridge is also part of the fastest travel link between Montreal and the cities of Trois-Rivières and Quebec City, both on the northern shores of the Saint Lawrence River.

The bridge has three lanes of traffic in each direction. The six-lane segment on A-40 eastbound continues until after the Quebec Autoroute 640 junction.

See also
 List of bridges in Canada
 List of bridges in Quebec
 List of bridges spanning the Rivière des Prairies
 List of crossings of the Rivière des Prairies

Bridges in Montreal
Bridges completed in 1965
Rivière-des-Prairies–Pointe-aux-Trembles
Road bridges in Quebec
Transport in Terrebonne, Quebec